John Kemys George Thomas Spencer-Churchill  (27 December 1835 – 9 August 1913) was an administrator in the British colonial service serving as Governor of Montserrat and Commissioner of St Kitts and Nevis.

Spencer-Churchill was the second son of Lord Charles Spencer-Churchill born on 27 December 1835. He was educated at Winchester College and joined the Army in 1854 serving at the siege of Sebastapol.

After leaving the Army he joined the colonial service in the West Indies where he held a number of administrative appointments, including President of the British Virgin Islands from 1879 to 1882, Governor of Montserrat from 1888 to 1889 and Commissioner of St Kitts and Nevis from 1889 to 1895.

Family life
Spencer-Churchill married Edith Maxwell Lockhart in 1881
 He died at Falmouth on 9 August 1913, aged 78.

References

1835 births
1913 deaths
Governors of Montserrat
Presidents of the British Virgin Islands
Governors of Saint Christopher-Nevis-Anguilla
Companions of the Order of St Michael and St George
British Army personnel of the Crimean War
John Kemys
Civil servants from London
People educated at Winchester College